OceanWorld 3D is a 2009 stereoscopic 3D documentary directed by Jean-Jacques Mantello and narrated by Marion Cotillard. The film is about the variety of animal life in the ocean. It features Californian kelp forests, the Great Barrier Reef in Australia, and the Roca Partida island off the coast of Mexico, which is home to thousands of sharks and other marine animals. Among the featured species are the manta ray, the hammerhead shark, the lionfish,  the Spanish dancer, the dolphin, and a few of the largest cetaceans on the planet.

References

External links
Ocean World 3D Official Site

Documentary films about marine biology
Documentary films about nature
2009 films
2009 documentary films
3D Entertainment films
3D documentary films
2009 3D films